Folk saints are dead people or other spiritually powerful entities (such as indigenous spirits) venerated as saints, but not officially canonized. Since they are saints of the "folk", or the populus, they are also called popular saints. Like officially recognized saints, folk saints are considered intercessors with God, but many are also understood to act directly in the lives of their devotees.

Frequently, their actions in life as well as in death distinguish folk saints from their canonized counterparts: official doctrine would consider many of them sinners and false idols. Their ranks are filled by folk healers, indigenous spirits, and folk heroes. Folk saints occur throughout the Catholic world, and they are especially popular in Latin America, where most have small followings; a few are celebrated at the national or even international level.

Origins
In the pre-Christian Abrahamic tradition, the prophets and holy people who were honored with shrines were identified by popular acclaim rather than official designation. In fact, the Islamic counterparts of the Christian saints, associated most closely with Sufism, are still identified this way. Early Christians followed in the same tradition when they visited the shrines of martyrs to ask for intercession with God.

Thus, there is a long tradition for the veneration of unofficial saints, and modern folk saints continue to reach popularity in much the same way as ever. Tales of miracles or good works performed during the person's life are spread by word of mouth, and, according to anthropologist Octavio Ignacio Romano, "if exceptional fame is achieved, it may happen that after his [or her] death the same cycle of stories told during life will continue to be repeated." Popularity is likely to increase if new miracles continue to be reported after death. Hispanic studies professor Frank Graziano explains:

[M]any folk devotions begin through the clouding of the distinction between praying for and praying to a recently deceased person. If several family members and friends pray at someone's tomb, perhaps lighting candles and leaving offerings, their actions arouse the curiosity of others. Some give it a try—the for and the to begin intermingling—because the frequent visits to the tomb suggest that the soul of its occupant may be miraculous. As soon as miracles are announced, often by family members and friends, newcomers arrive to send up prayers, now to the miraculous soul, with the hope of having their requests granted.

This initial rise to fame follows much the same trajectory as that of the official saints. Professor of Spanish Kathleen Ann Myers writes that Rose of Lima, the first canonized American saint, attracted "mass veneration beginning almost at the moment of the mystic's death." Crowds of people appeared at her funeral, where some even cut off pieces of her clothing to keep as relics. A lay religious movement quickly developed with Rosa de Lima at the center but she was not officially canonized until half of a century later. In the meantime, she was essentially a folk saint.

As the Church spread, it became more influential in regions that celebrated deities and heroes that were not part of Catholic tradition. Many of those figures were incorporated into a local variety of Catholicism: the ranks of official saints then came to include a number of non-Catholics or even fictional persons. Church leaders made an effort in 1969 to purge such figures from the official list of saints, though at least some probably remain. Many folk saints have their origins in this same mixing of Catholic traditions and local cultural and religious traditions. To distinguish canonized saints from folk saints, the latter are sometimes called animas or "spirits" instead of saints.

Local character
Folk saints tend to come from the same communities as their followers. In death, they are said to continue as active members of their communities, remaining embedded within a system of reciprocity that reaches beyond the grave. Devotees offer prayers to the folk saints and present them with offerings, and folk saints repay the favors by dispensing small miracles. Many folk saints inhabit marginalized communities, the needs of which are more worldly than others; they therefore frequently act in a more worldly, more pragmatic, less dogmatic fashion than their official counterparts. Devotion to folk saints, then, frequently takes on a distinctly local character, a result of the syncretic mixing of traditions and the particular needs of the community.

The contrast between the manner in which Latin American and European folk saints are said to intercede in the lives of their followers provides a good illustration. In Western Europe, writes anthropologist and religious historian William A. Christian, "the more pervasive influence of scientific medicine, the comparative stability of Western European governments and above all, the more effective presence of the institutional Church" have meant that unofficial holy people generally work within established doctrine. Latin American holy persons, on the other hand, often stray much further from official canon. Whereas European folk saints serve merely as messengers of the divine, their Latin American counterparts frequently act directly in the lives of their devotees.

During the Counter-Reformation in Europe, the Council of Trent released a decree "On the Invocation, Veneration, and Relics, of Saints, and on Sacred Images," which explained that in Roman Catholic doctrine images and relics of the saints are to be used by worshipers to help them contemplate the saints and the virtues that they represent but that those images and relics do not actually embody the saints. In the same way, folk saints in Europe are seen as intermediaries between penitents and the divine but are not considered powerful in and of themselves. A shrine may be built "that becomes the location for the fulfillment of the village's calendrical obligations and critical supplications to the shrine image—the village's divine protector," Christian writes, but "in this context the shrine image and the site of its location are of prime importance; the seer merely introduces it, and is not himself or herself the focal point of the worship."

In pre-Columbian Mesoamerican tradition, on the other hand, representation meant embodiment of these holy figures rather than mere resemblance, as it did in Europe. Thus, pre-Hispanic Mexican and Central American images were understood to actually take on the character and spirit of the deities they represented, a perspective that was considered idolatry by European Catholics. As the inheritors of this tradition, folk saints of the region often are seen to act directly in the lives of their devotees rather than serving as mere intermediaries, and they are themselves venerated. Visitors frequently treat the representations of folk saints as real people, observing proper etiquette for speaking to a socially superior person or to a friend depending on the spirit's disposition—shaking hands, or offering it a cigarette or a drink.

The popularity of a particular folk saint also depends on the changing dynamics and needs of the community over time. The popular devotion to Yevgeny Rodionov provides an example. Rodionov was a Russian soldier who was killed by rebels in Chechnya after he reportedly refused to renounce his religion or remove a cross he wore around his neck. He is not recognized by the Russian Orthodox Church as an official saint, yet within a few years of his death he had gained a popular following: his image appeared in homes and churches around Russia, his hometown started drawing pilgrims, and he began to receive prayers and requests for intercession. Rodionov became a favorite folk saint for soldiers and came to represent Russian nationalism at a time of conflict when the country was still reeling from the dissolution of the Soviet Union. As one journalist observed in 2003, his death and transition into the role of a folk saint served "to fill a nationalist hunger for popular heroes" when heroes were sorely needed.

Devotions
A devotee might visit the shrine of a folk saint for any number of reasons, including general requests for good health and good luck, the lifting of a curse, or protection on the road, but most folk saints have specialties for which their help is sought. Difunta Correa, for example, specializes in helping her followers acquire new homes and businesses. Juan Bautista Morillo helps gamblers in Venezuela, and Juan Soldado watches over border crossings between Mexico and the United States. This practice is not so different from that of canonized saints—St. Benedict, for example, is the patron saint of agricultural workers—but it would be hard to find a canonized saint to look after narcotics traffickers, as does Jesús Malverde. In fact, a number of folk saints attract devotees precisely because they respond to requests that the official saints are unlikely to answer. As Griffith writes, "One needs ask for help where the help is likely to be effective." So long as followers come before them with faith and perform the proper devotions, some folk saints are as willing to place a curse on a person as to lift one.

An offering to a folk saint might include the same votive candles and ex-votos (tributes of thanks) left at the shrines to canonized saints, but they also frequently include other items that reflect something of the spirit's former life or personality. Thus, Difunta Correa, who died of thirst, is given bottles of water; Maximón and the spirit of Pancho Villa are both offered cigarettes and alcohol; teddy bears and toys are left at the tomb of a little boy called Carlitos in a cemetery in Hermosillo, Mexico. Likewise, prayers to folk saints are often paired with or incorporate aspects of the Rosary but (as with many canonized saints) special petitions have been composed for many of them, each prayer evoking the particular characteristics of the saint being addressed. Other local or regional idiosyncrasies also creep in. In parts of Mexico and Central America, for example, the aromatic resin copal is burned for the more syncretic spirits like Maximón, a practice that has its roots in the offerings made to indigenous deities.

As long as the spirits come through for their followers, devotees will return. Word of mouth spreads news of cures and good fortune, and particularly responsive spirits are likely to gain a large following. Not all remain popular, however. While official saints remain canonized regardless of their popularity, folk saints that lose their devotees through their failure to respond to petitions might fade from memory entirely.

Relationship with the Catholic Church
In areas where the Catholic Church has greater power, it maintains more control over the devotional lives of its members. Thus, in Europe, folk devotions that are encouraged by the Church are quickly institutionalized, while those that are discouraged usually die out or continue only at reduced levels. For similar reasons, folk saints are more often venerated in poor and marginalized communities than in affluent ones. Nor are folk saints found in shrines to the canonical saints, though the reverse is often true: it is not uncommon for a folk saint's shrine to be decorated with images of other folk saints as well as members of the official Catholic communion. Shrines in the home, too, frequently include official and unofficial saints together. Graziano explains:

 Catholicism is not so much abandoned as expanded [by folk practitioners]; it is stretched to encompass exceptional resources. Whereas Catholicism ... defends a distinction between canonical and non-canonical or orthodox and heterodox, folk devotion intermingles these quite naturally and without reserve.

List of folk saints by country

See also
Apotheosis
:Category:Folk saints
Folk religion
Folk Catholicism
Folk Christianity
Chinese folk religion
Orisha
Saint
Phallic saint
Secular saint
Military saint

References

Sources

External links